Dmitry Molosh ( (Dzmitry Molash); ; born 10 December 1981) is a Belarusian professional football manager and former player. He is the manager of Torpedo-BelAZ Zhodino.

Playing career
Molosh previously played for FC Nosta Novotroitsk in the Russian First Division.

He is known for his long-range powerful shot which helped him to score several long distance goals.

Honours
BATE Borisov
Belarusian Premier League champion: 2002, 2006
Belarusian Cup winner: 2005–06

References

External links

1981 births
Living people
Belarusian footballers
Association football defenders
Belarus international footballers
Belarusian expatriate footballers
Expatriate footballers in Russia
Belarusian Premier League players
Russian Premier League players
Belarusian expatriate sportspeople in Russia
FC Molodechno players
FC BATE Borisov players
FC Nosta Novotroitsk players
FC Sibir Novosibirsk players
PFC Krylia Sovetov Samara players
FC Dinamo Minsk players
Belarusian football managers
Belarusian expatriate football managers
Expatriate football managers in Latvia
FC Smolevichi managers
FK Liepāja managers
FC Torpedo Zhodino managers